Johan Olof Nyström (born 16 November 1975) is a Swedish swimmer. He was born in Sollefteå, but grew up in Skellefteå, Västerbotten.

He competed at the 2000 Olympic Games in Sydney, Australia.

References
  Men's short course Meters World records as of 18 November 2007.
 

1975 births
Swimmers at the 2000 Summer Olympics
Olympic swimmers of Sweden
Living people
World record setters in swimming
Swedish male freestyle swimmers
Medalists at the FINA World Swimming Championships (25 m)
People from Sollefteå Municipality
Sportspeople from Västernorrland County